Carrie Anne Savage is an American voice actress. Her anime roles included Rakka in Haibane Renmei, Solty Revant in SoltyRei, the Mokonas in xxxHolic and Tsubasa: Reservoir Chronicle, Miu Fūrinji on Kenichi: The Mightiest Disciple, Hakufu Sonsaku  in Ikki Tousen, Kaede Fuyou in Shuffle!, Nancy in R.O.D The TV, Penny in Crayon Shin-chan and Asta in Trinity Blood. She has charitable work in countries such as Africa, Mexico and the Philippines.

Filmography

Anime

 A Certain Scientific Railgun series – Eri Haruue
 Angel Tales – Tamami the Cat
 Aquarion – Rena Rune
 Aquarion Evol – Crea Drosera
 Aquarion Logos – Karan Uminagi
 B'tX – J'Taime
 Babel II: Beyond Infinity – Meilin
 Baccano! – Lua Klein
 Baldr Force EXE Resolution – Ren Mizusaka
 Bamboo Blade – Satori Azuma
 Birdy the Mighty Decode – Marina
 Black Blood Brothers – Sei
 Black Cat – Saki
 Blassreiter – Maria
 Bleach – Mareyo Omaeda
 Boys Be... – Nao Nitta
 Casshern Sins – Sophita
 Chaos;Head – Rimi
 Claymore - Claymore B / Awakening Yoma Girl
 Corpse Princess – Hibiki Shinjou / Hina
 D.Gray-man – Mei-Ling
 Daphne in the Brilliant Blue – Maia Mizuki
 Darker than Black – Meena Kandaswamy
 DearS – Nia
 Dragonaut: The Resonance – Laura
 Durarara!! – Mika Harima
 El Cazador de la Bruja – Maria / Iris Gonzalez
 Ergo Proxy – Dorothy / Monad
 Fairy Tail – Lisanna Strauss
 Fate/Zero – Shirley
 Fullmetal Alchemist – Lydia
 The Galaxy Railways – Liffle
 Gankutsuou: The Count of Monte Cristo – Peppo
 Ghost Hunt – Wakako Yoshimi
 Ghost in the Shell: Stand Alone Complex 2nd Gig – Tachikoma / Theresa 
 Ghost Talker's Daydream – Ai Kunugi
 Girls Bravo – Koyomi Hare Nanaka
 Guilty Crown – Chika Arimura
 Gunslinger Girl: Il Teatrino – Aurora
 Gun Sword – Priscilla
 Haibane Renmei – Rakka
 Heaven's Lost Property – Chaos
 Hell Girl – Miki Kamikawa
 I's – Itsuki Akiba
 Idol Project – Kiwi
 Ikki Tousen series – Hakufu Sonsaku
 K – Kukuri Yukizome (Season 1)
 Kamichu! – Tama / Tohu-chan
 Kaze no Stigma – Tiana
 Kekkaishi – Aoi Shinagawa
 Kenichi: The Mightiest Disciple – Miu Fūrinji
 Ladies versus Butlers! – Selnia Iori Flameheart
 Last Exile: Fam, the Silver Wing – Millia Il Vech Cutrettola Turan
 Linebarrels of Iron – Risako Niiyama
 Liz and the Blue Bird – Meiko
 L/R: Licensed by Royalty – Eric's Girlfriend
 Maken-ki! – Otohime Yamato
 Marmalade Boy – Arimi Suzuki
 Melody of Oblivion – Sayoko Tsukinomori
 Mermaid Forest – Mitsue
 Moon Phase – Artemis
 Murder Princess – Ana / Yuna
 Mushishi – Akoya / Miharu
 Negima! series – Zazie Rainyday / Satomi Hakase
 One Piece (Funimation dub) – Kaya
 Origin: Spirits of the Past – Toola
 Ouran High School Host Club – Momoka Kurakano
 Paranoia Agent – Maromi
 Peach Girl – Sumire
 Pokémon: Black and White – Christie
 Pokémon the Series: XY – Heidi
 Puella Magi Madoka Magica – Junko Kaname
 R.O.D. the TV – Nancy Makuhari
 Ragnarok the Animation – Yufa
 Romeo x Juliet – Hermione
 Rumbling Hearts – Haruka Suzumiya
 Rumic Theater – Bride / Mitsue / Oda
 S-CRY-ed – Kanami Yuta
 Sakura Wars: Sumire – Iris Chateaubriand
 Samurai 7 – Honoka
 Sasami: Magical Girls Club – Itoki
 Save Me! Lollipop! – Nanase (Young), Sixteen
 School Rumble – Karen Ichijo
 Sekirei – Mitsuha
 Sgt. Frog – Angol Mois
 Shakugan no Shana – Chiara Toscana
 Shin-chan – Penny
 Shingetsutan Tsukihime – Satsuki Yumizuka
 Shuffle! – Kaede Fuyou
 SoltyRei – Solty Revant
 Soul Eater – Rachel
 Spirit of Wonder Scientific Boy's Club – Miss China
 Squid Girl – Kiyomi Sakura
 Stellvia – Shima Katase
 Strain: Strategic Armored Infantry – Jessie Iges
 Strawberry Eggs – Fuko Kuzuha / Toko Kuzuha
 Suzuka – Megumi Matsumoto
 Texnolyze – Ran
 The Tower of Druaga – Succubus
 Trinity Blood – Astharoshe Asran, Catherina (Young)
 Tsubasa: Reservoir Chronicle – Mokona Modoki
 Ultra Maniac – Nina Sakura
 Vampire Knight series – Rima Toya / Nadeshiko Shindo
 Witchblade – Rihoko Amaha
 Xenosaga: The Animation – Nephillim
 xxxHolic – Mokona Modoki

Films
 Case Closed: The Fourteenth Target – Tammy Diez
 Fairy Tail the Movie: Phoenix Priestess – Lisanna Strauss
 Origin: Spirits of the Past – Toola
 Sakura Wars: The Movie – Iris Chateaubriand
 xxxHolic: A Midsummer Night's Dream – Black Mokona

Video games

 Armored Core: Verdict Day - Allied Operator / 20's Female Pilot, 30's Female Pilot
 BlazBlue: Cross Tag Battle – Celica A. Mercury (uncredited)
 Case Closed: The Mirapolis Investigation – Linda Hill
 Comic Jumper: The Adventures of Captain Smiley – Coco / Bradbots
 Crisis Core: Final Fantasy VII – Cissnei
 Dynasty Warriors 5 – Diao Chan / Xing Cai (uncredited)
 Dynasty Warriors 6 – Diao Chan / Xiao Qiao (uncredited)
 Final Fantasy Crystal Chronicles: The Crystal Bearers – Althea Sol Alfiraria
 Final Fantasy Type-0 HD – Additional Voices
 Muv-Luv: Project Mikhail – Haruka Suzumiya
 One Piece: Unlimited Adventure – Popora
 Phantom Breaker: Omnia – Rimi Sakihata
 Rune Factory: Tides of Destiny - Candy
 Smite – Scylla
 Street Fighter V – Marz
 Street Fighter X Tekken – Ling Xiaoyu
 Tales of Legendia – Shirley Fennes (uncredited)
 Valkyrie Profile 2: Silmeria – Dirna Hamilton
 Warriors Orochi – Diao Chan / Xiao Qiao (uncredited)
 Warriors Orochi 2 – Diao Chan / Xiao Qiao (uncredited)

Other
 Adventures in Voice Acting – Herself
 Running Man the Animation - Miyo

Staff credits

Voice director
 Baldr Force EXE Resolution
 Ouran High School Host Club
 Sasami: Magical Girls Club
 Shuffle!
 Suzuka

Script writer
 School Rumble
 Shuffle!
 Liz and the Blue Bird

References

External links
 
 
 
 

Year of birth missing (living people)
American stage actresses
American voice actresses
American television writers
American women screenwriters
Place of birth missing (living people)
American women television writers
American voice directors
Living people
21st-century American actresses
Actresses from New York City
Screenwriters from New York (state)